Cassandra Levesque (born ) is an American politician in the state of New Hampshire. She has been a Democratic member of the New Hampshire House of Representatives since 2018, representing the Strafford 4 district. Levesque has contributed to efforts to eliminate child marriage in New Hampshire.

Early life 
Levesque became a Girl Scout when she was five years old. She began researching child marriage as a project for the program's Gold Award. Levesque worked with her state Representative, Jackie Cilley, to draft a bill that would eliminate provisions allowing minors to marry with judicial and parental consent. The state House of Representatives voted against the bill's passage. Despite the bill's failure, other legislation sponsored by Cilley passed which raised the minimum age for marriage from 13 to 16. Levesque said she would continue to advocate for the minimum marriage age to be raised to 18.

Electoral politics 
When both incumbents from the Strafford 4 district, Cilley and Len Turcotte, decided to retire, local Democrats convinced Levesque to run in the 2018 election. Levesque was elected on a campaign of representing small businesses and addressing water-quality issues. At 19, she became the youngest serving member of New Hampshire's legislature. Levesque has continued to press the issue of child marriage in the legislature.

Electoral history

2018

2020

2022

See also 

 List of the youngest state legislators in the United States

Notes

References 

Living people
Democratic Party members of the New Hampshire House of Representatives
Year of birth missing (living people)
People from Barrington, New Hampshire
Southern New Hampshire University alumni
Women state legislators in New Hampshire
21st-century American politicians
21st-century American women politicians